Jannaschia aquimarina is a Gram-negative, aerobic, and non-motile bacterium from the genus of Jannaschia which has been isolated from seawater from Korea.

References

Rhodobacteraceae
Bacteria described in 2012